Howard K. "Brutus" Wilson (born c. 1906) was an American football and basketball coach. He served as the head football coach at Winston-Salem Teachers College—now known as Winston-Salem State University—in Winston-Salem, North Carolina from 1941 to 1945 and Shaw University in Raleigh, North Carolina from 1946 to 1953. Wilson was also the head basketball coach at Morgan State College—now known as Morgan State University—in Baltimore, tallying a mark of 109–141. Wilson's 1947 Shaw Bears football team was undefeated, won the Colored Intercollegiate Athletic Association (CIAA) title, and was recognized as a black college football national champion.

Wilson graduated from Morgan State and earned a Master of Arts from Columbia University. Before moving to Winston-Salem State, he worked at the Johnston County Training School in Smithfield, North Carolina for six years.

Wilson was inducted into the CIAA Hall of Fame in 2001.

Head coaching record

Football

References

Year of birth uncertain
Year of death missing
1900s births
American football fullbacks
American football quarterbacks
Morgan State Bears football players
Morgan State Bears men's basketball coaches
Morgan State Bears men's basketball players
Shaw Bears football coaches
Shaw Bears men's basketball coaches
Winston-Salem State Rams football coaches
Winston-Salem State Rams men's basketball coaches
College men's basketball head coaches in the United States
Columbia University alumni
African-American coaches of American football
African-American players of American football
African-American basketball coaches
African-American basketball players
20th-century African-American people